The City of Tears is a lost 1918 silent film comedy drama directed by Elsie Jane Wilson and starring Carmel Myers and Leatrice Joy. It was distributed by the Universal Film Manufacturing Company.

Cast
Carmel Myers - Rosa Carillo
Edwin August - Tony Bonchi
Earl Rodney - Billy Leeds (*aka Earle Rodney)
Leatrice Joy - Maria
Lottie Kruse - Katrina

References

External links

1918 films
American silent feature films
Lost American films
Universal Pictures films
American black-and-white films
1910s English-language films
1918 comedy-drama films
1918 lost films
Lost comedy-drama films
1910s American films
Silent American comedy-drama films